In the study of Earth's atmosphere, subsidence is the downward movement of an air parcel as it cools and becomes denser. By contrast, warm air becomes less dense and moves upwards (atmospheric convection).

Subsidence generally creates a high-pressure area as more air moves into the same space: the polar highs are areas of almost constant subsidence, as are the horse latitudes, and the areas of subsidence are the sources of much of the world's prevailing winds.

Subsidence also causes many smaller-scale weather phenomena, such as morning fog. An extreme form of subsidence is a downburst, which can result in damage similar to that produced by a tornado. A milder form of subsidence is referred to as downdraft.

Atmospheric pressure and atmospheric subsidence
The Dosen barometer (pictured) clearly relates high pressure with fine weather, as seen in its dial. This is because high pressure zones are subsidence zones, with dry and cool air descending and, therefore, clear skies and good weather.

See also
 Diathermancy
 Convection

References

Atmosphere
Meteorological phenomena